Ichthyococcus ovatus is a lightfish of the genus Ichthyococcus.

References

Ichthyococcus
Fish described in 1838
Taxa named by Anastasio Cocco